The Lutuv (Lautu)' are an indigenous people inhabiting Southern Chin State in Myanmar. The Lutuv were initially known by other tribes as the 'Lautu' of the Southern Independent Villages derived from the Hakha derivation of their name. The Lutuv are concentrated in 16 villages; it is believed that the first Lutuv founded Tisen village in approximately AD 1450. The Lutuv speak the Lutuv language.

As of January 2017, the Lutuv population was approximately 18,000 and predominantly Christian. They have emigrated to Australia and the United States. There are 16 Lutuv settlements in Chin State:

1. Hnaring town

2. Khuahrang

3. Thang-Aw

4. Fanthen - (Aasaw)

5. Surngen 

6. Tisen 

7. Sentung 

8. Hriangpi 

9. Saate 

10. Leikang 

11. Longthantlang 

12. Zuamang 

13. Capaw 

14. Pintia 

15. La-uu

16. Lei-Pi

References

Ethnic groups in Myanmar